Nene Sakite I (died in 1892 in Odumase Krobo) was the second Konor, or paramount chief, of the Manya Krobo and reigned 1867 until his death in 1892. He was succeeded by Emmanuel Mate Kole who ruled Manya Krobo from 1892 until his death in 1939.

He was born in Odumase Krobo in the Eastern Region of Ghana.

References 

19th-century rulers in Africa
Ga-Adangbe people
Year of birth unknown
Date of birth unknown
Date of death unknown
1892 deaths